George Albert Ratcliffe (7 December 1876 – 4 June 1944) was an English footballer.

Club career
Ratcliffe played his early football in the North Staffordshire League. His football skills resulted in him being signed by Crewe Alexandra. Later he had spells at Sheffield United and Grimsby Town.

In 1900, Arnold Hills decided to bring in some experienced players to his new West Ham side. He played in 17 games in his first season, bagging 4 goals. Three of those coming in the last two matches of the season. The 1901-02 season was a big improvement and he ended up as joint top scorer with Billy Grassam, scoring 10 times in 24 games. At the end of the season Ratcliffe was transferred to Doncaster Rovers.

References

1876 births
1944 deaths
Crewe Alexandra F.C. players
Doncaster Rovers F.C. players
English footballers
Association football wingers
Grimsby Town F.C. players
Sportspeople from Hanley, Staffordshire
West Ham United F.C. players